Acaulospora thomii is a species of fungus in the family Acaulosporaceae. It forms arbuscular mycorrhiza and vesicles in roots. Found in Poland growing under Triticum aestivum, it was described as a new species in 1988.

References

Diversisporales
Fungi described in 1988
Fungi of Europe